Sergio Zijler (born 8 July 1987) is a Dutch footballer who plays as a winger. He is currently without a club.

Career
Born in Rotterdam, Sergio Zijler played in the youth team of AFC Ajax until 2006.

FC Twente
Zijler is a striker who made his debut in professional football squad of FC Twente in the 2006–07 season playing twelve matches and scoring two goals. Both goals were scored in his debut match (7–1 win) against FC Groningen.

Willem II
In January he made the switch to Willem II from Tilburg for an undisclosed fee.

HNK Rijeka
During the winter break of the 2010–11 season, Sergio Zijler decided to accept a move out of Netherlands and join Croatian side HNK Rijeka.  He played with Rijeka until the end of the 2010–11 Prva HNL season.

Orduspor
On July 28, 2011, Zijler signed with Turkish club Orduspor Free Transfer.

National team
Sergio Zijler was part of the Netherlands U-17 team in 2003.

In 2009, he played for the combination team of the Suriname national football team and the 'Suriprofs' (Surinamese professional players in the Netherlands) at the Parbo Bier Cup tournament.

References

1987 births
Living people
Footballers from Rotterdam
Dutch footballers
Dutch sportspeople of Surinamese descent
Dutch expatriate footballers
Association football forwards
FC Twente players
Willem II (football club) players
Achilles '29 players
FC Universitatea Cluj players
Eredivisie players
Eerste Divisie players
Derde Divisie players
HNK Rijeka players
NK Zelina players
Croatian Football League players
Expatriate footballers in Croatia
Dutch expatriate sportspeople in Croatia
Orduspor footballers
Expatriate footballers in Turkey
FC Lienden players